Michael Joseph O'Rahilly ( or ; 22 April 1875 – 29 April 1916), known as The O'Rahilly, was an Irish republican and nationalist; he was a founding member of the Irish Volunteers in 1913 and served as Director of Arms. Despite opposing the action, he took part in the Easter Rising in Dublin and was killed in a charge on a British machine gun post covering the retreat from the Dublin GPO during the fighting.

Early life
O'Rahilly was born in Ballylongford, County Kerry, to  Richard Rahilly, a grocer, and Ellen Rahilly (née Mangan). He was educated at Clongowes Wood College (1890–1893). He had two siblings who lived to adulthood, Mary Ellen "Nell" Humphreys (née Rahilly) and Anno O'Rahilly, both of whom were active in the Irish revolutionary period. As an adult, he became a republican and a language enthusiast. He joined the Gaelic League and became a member of An Coiste Gnotha, its governing body. He was well travelled, spending at least a decade in the United States and in Europe before settling in Dublin.

He married Nancy Brown on 15 April 1899 in New York and the couple had six sons together.

O'Rahilly was a founding member of the Irish Volunteers in 1913, who organized to work for Irish independence, and initially to defend the proposed Home Rule; he served as the Irish Volunteers' Director of Arms. He personally directed the first major arming of the Volunteers, the landing of 900 Mausers at the Howth gun-running on 26 July 1914.

O'Rahilly was a wealthy man; the Weekly Irish Times reported after the Easter Rising that he "enjoyed a private income of £900" per annum, plenty of which went to "the cause he espoused".

The Irish Volunteers
O'Rahilly was not party to the plans for the Easter Rising, nor was he a member of the Irish Republican Brotherhood (IRB), but he was one of the main people who trained the Irish Volunteers for the coming fight. The planners of the Rising went to great lengths to prevent those leaders of the Volunteers who were opposed to unprovoked, unilateral action from learning that a rising was imminent, including its Chief-of-Staff Eoin MacNeill, Bulmer Hobson, and O'Rahilly. When Hobson discovered that an insurrection was planned, he was kidnapped by the Military Council leadership.

Learning this, O'Rahilly went to Patrick Pearse's school, Scoil Éanna, on Good Friday. He barged into Pearse's study, brandishing his revolver as he announced "Whoever kidnaps me will have to be a quicker shot!" Pearse calmed O'Rahilly, assuring him that Hobson was unharmed, and would be released after the Rising began.

O'Rahilly took instructions from MacNeill and spent the night driving throughout the country, informing Volunteer leaders in Cork, Kerry, Tipperary, and Limerick that they were not to mobilise their forces for planned manoeuvres on Sunday.

Easter Rising
Arriving home, he learned that the Rising was about to begin in Dublin on the next day, Easter Monday, 24 April 1916. Despite his efforts to prevent such action (which he felt could only lead to defeat), he set out to Liberty Hall to join Pearse, James Connolly, Thomas MacDonagh, Tom Clarke, Joseph Plunkett, Countess Markievicz, Seán Mac Diarmada, Éamonn Ceannt and their Irish Volunteers and Irish Citizen Army troops. Arriving in his De Dion-Bouton motorcar, he gave one of the most quoted lines of the rising – "Well, I've helped to wind up the clock -- I might as well hear it strike!" Another famous, if less quoted line, was his comment to Markievicz, "It is madness, but it is glorious madness." His car was used to fetch supplies during the siege, and later as part of a barricade on Prince's Street, where it was burned out.

He fought with the GPO garrison during Easter Week. One of the first British prisoners taken in the GPO was Second Lieutenant AD Chalmers, who was bound with telephone wire and lodged in a telephone box by the young Volunteer Captain and IRB activist Michael Collins. Chalmers later recalled O'Rahilly's kindness to him. In a statement to a newspaper reporter, he said that he was taken from the phone box after three hours and brought up to O'Rahilly, who ordered: "I want this officer to watch the safe to see that nothing is touched. You will see that no harm comes to him."

On Friday 28 April, with the GPO on fire, O'Rahilly volunteered to lead a party of men along a route to Williams and Woods, a factory on Great Britain Street (now Parnell Street). A British machine-gun at the intersection of Great Britain and Moore streets cut him and several of the others down. O'Rahilly slumped into a doorway on Moore Street, wounded and bleeding badly but, hearing the English marking his position, made a dash across the road to find shelter in Sackville Lane (now O'Rahilly Parade). He was wounded diagonally from shoulder to hip by sustained fire from the machine-gunner.

According to ambulance driver Albert Mitchell (in a witness statement more than 30 years later), O'Rahilly still clung to life 19 hours after being severely wounded, long after the surrender had taken place on Saturday afternoon. The following is an extract:

Desmond Ryan's The Rising maintains that it "was 2.30pm when Miss O'Farrell reached Moore Street, and as she passed Sackville Lane again, she saw O'Rahilly's corpse lying a few yards up the laneway, his feet against a stone stairway in front of a house, his head towards the street."

Memorial

O'Rahilly wrote a message to his wife on the back of a letter he had received in the GPO from his son. Shane Cullen etched this last message to Nannie O'Rahilly into his limestone and bronze memorial sculpture to The O'Rahilly. The text reads:

The O'Rahilly House 

O'Rahilly's home between 1910 and 1916, at 40 Herbert Park, was contentiously demolished in September 2020. Permission for the Edwardian era building's demolition was given by An Bord Pleanála, despite calls from various political parties for its preservation on grounds of its connection to The O'Rahilly. The Department of Culture, Heritage and the Gaeltacht had also earlier voiced its support for the retention of the three adjoining properties for architectural reasons. The council's own conservation section had been assessing the building for listing on the Record of Protected Structures, having earlier passed over the building for protection on a number of occasions.

Source of name

In Gaelic tradition, chiefs of clan were called by their clan name preceded by the definite article, for example Robert the Bruce. O'Rahilly's calling himself "The O'Rahilly" was purely his own idea. In 1938, the poet William Butler Yeats defended O'Rahilly on this point in his poem "The O'Rahilly", which begins:

See also
 Ronan O'Rahilly

Notes

References
O'Rahilly, Aodogán; Winding the Clock - O'Rahilly and the 1916 Rising, Lilliput Press, 1991
Caulfield, Max; The Easter Rebellion, Dublin 1916, Roberts Reinhart, 1963

External links
Michael O'Rahilly (Mícheál Ua Rathghaille) in the 1911 Census of Ireland

1875 births
1916 deaths
Irish republicans
People from County Kerry
People of the Easter Rising
People educated at Clongowes Wood College